Nu (25 May 1907 – 14 February 1995), commonly known as U Nu and also by the honorific name Thakin Nu, was a leading Burmese statesman and nationalist politician. He was the first Prime Minister of Burma under the provisions of the 1947 Constitution of the Union of Burma, from 4 January 1948 to 12 June 1956, again from 28 February 1957 to 28 October 1958, and finally from 4 April 1960 to 2 March 1962.

Biography
Nu was born to U San Tun and Daw Saw Khin of Wakema, Myaungmya District, British Burma.  He attended Myoma High School in Yangon, and received a B.A. from Rangoon University in 1929. In 1935 he married Mya Yi while studying for a Bachelor of Laws.

Political career

Struggle for independence
Nu's political life started as president of the Rangoon University Students Union (RUSU) with M. A. Rashid as vice-president and U Thi Han as the general secretary. Aung San was editor and publicity officer. Nu and Aung San were both expelled from the university after an article, Hell Hound At Large, appeared in the union magazine, which was obviously about the rector. Their expulsion sparked off the second university students' strike in February 1936. Aung San and Nu became members of the nationalist Dobama Asiayone (Our Burma Association) which had been formed in 1930 and henceforth gained the prefix Thakin ('Master'), proclaiming they were the true masters of their own land. For a few years after independence in 1948 Nu retained the prefix 'Thakin', but around 1952 he announced that since Burma was already independent the prefix of 'Thakin' was no longer needed and henceforth he would be known as U ('Mr') Nu. In 1937 he co-founded with Thakin Than Tun the Nagani (Red Dragon) Book Club which for the first time widely circulated Burmese-language translations of the Marxist classics. He also became a leader and co-founder of the People's Revolutionary Party (PRP), which later became the Socialist Party, and the umbrella organisation the Anti-Fascist People's Freedom League (AFPFL), which advocated Burmese independence from both Japanese and British control during the 1940s. He was detained by the colonial government in 1940 along with Thakin Soe, Thakin Than Tun, Kyaw Nyein, U Măd, and Ba Maw. The prison holding Nu was largely abandoned by the British in the course of the rapid Japanese advance.

From August 1943, when the Japanese declared nominal independence for Burma under a regime led by Ba Maw, Nu was appointed foreign minister. In 1944 he was appointed minister of information until the open rebellion by the AFPFL against the Japanese military in March 1945. Though aware of the resistance and in contact with its leaders, Nu did not actively participate in the underground activities of the AFPFL up to the rebellion, and unlike its leading figure Aung San, did not join the rebellion and move to areas under Allied control. Instead, Nu retreated with the Japanese and Ba Maw in late April, 1945. Nu was nearly killed on August 12, 1945, when Allied pilots strafed and destroyed the house Ba Maw had been given by the retreating Japanese, but both escaped the residence during the attack. Following Japanese surrender, Nu retired from politics for a time, writing his memoirs of the war years, Burma Under the Japanese and tracts on Marxism. As a popular figure with early connections to Aung San and other nationalists from their student days, however, Nu was drawn back into the politics of the AFPFL where he initially struggled to keep its Communist contingent within the party.

After the assassination of its political and military leader Aung San along with his cabinet ministers on 19 July 1947, U Nu led the AFPFL and signed an independence agreement (the Nu-Attlee Treaty) with the British Premier Clement Attlee in October 1947.

Parliamentary era

Burma gained independence from Britain on 4 January 1948. U Nu became the chairman of the Old Myoma Students Association in Yangon. He became the first Prime Minister of independent Burma, and he had to deal with armed rebellion. The rebels included various ethnic groups, White Flag and Red Flag communist factions, and some regiments in the Army. Yet another challenge was the exiled Kuomintang (KMT).  After being chased out of (Mainland) China by the victorious Communists, they had established bases in eastern Burma, and it took several years in the early 1950s to drive them out. A democratic system was instituted and parliamentary elections were held several times. Throughout the 1950s, U Nu oversaw the implementation of the Pyidawtha Plan, a national economic development plan to establish an industrial welfare state in Burma.

He voluntarily relinquished the Prime Ministerial position in 1956. He was one of the leaders of the Anti-Fascist People's Freedom League (AFPFL) from 1942 to 1963. AFPFL member Ba Swe served as Prime Minister from June 1956 to June 1957. In 1955, the University of Belgrade (Yugoslavia) awarded him an honorary doctorate.

On 26 September 1958, he asked the Army Chief of Staff General Ne Win to take over as a "caretaker government", and Ne Win was sworn in as Prime Minister on 27 October 1958. In the February 1960 general election, U Nu's Clean faction of the AFPFL won in a landslide victory over the Stable faction led by U Ba Swe and Kyaw Nyein. U Nu returned to power forming the Pyidaungzu (Union) government on 4 April 1960. The Clean AFPFL was subsequently renamed the Union Party.

U Thant had been Secretary to the Prime Minister U Nu before he was appointed Burmese Ambassador to the United Nations in 1957. U Thant became the third UN Secretary-General in 1961.

Military era

Less than two years after his election victory, Nu was overthrown by a coup d'état led by General Ne Win on 2 March 1962. After the 1962 coup, U Nu was put in what was euphemistically called  'protective custody' in an army camp outside Rangoon. He was released more than four years later on 27 October 1966 [see the (Rangoon) Guardian and The Working People's Daily of 28 October 1966 concerning the news items of U Nu's release from custody]. Among others, on the day of the military coup on 2 March 1962 President Mahn Win Maung as well as Chief Justice U Myint Thein (22 February 1900 – 3 October 1994) was also put in 'protective custody'. Win Maung was released from detention in October 1967 and Myint Thein not until 28 February 1968.

On 2 December 1968, Ne Win, Chairman of the Union Revolutionary Council (RC), established a 33-man 'Internal Unity Advisory Board' (IUAB; known more informally as 'the thirty-three') of former politicians some of whom he had jailed (or put in protective custody) several years earlier. The Board was assigned with the task of advising the RC for possible suggestions to enhance internal unity and to make suggestions for possible political changes. U Nu was one of the 'thirty-three'. In February 1969, U Nu submitted an 'interim report' recommending that Ne Win hand over power back to him; that the Parliament abolished by Ne Win in March 1962 be reconvened. He proposed that the Parliament would meet and formally appoint Ne Win as president. In his proposal he stated that he made these suggestions in good faith after repeatedly mulling over alternative arrangements. He also stated that he made this proposal in absolute sincerity so that the Revolutionary Council not remain as 'usurpers' ('those who came to power through force') and the 'taint of illegality' of Ne Win's takeover be erased. (The English translation of U Nu's 'interim report' or proposals could be read in the 3 June 1969 issues of the Rangoon Guardian and the Working People's Daily).

Soon after submitting his 'report' or recommendations, U Nu, feigning illness, and under the pretext of a pilgrimage to India left Burma for India. When Ne Win made no response to his report, U Nu left India for London. In a speech given at the opening day of the Fourth Seminar of the ruling Burma Socialist Programme Party (BSPP) on 6 November 1969, Ne Win formally rejected U Nu's proposal, saying that he took over power – and held on to it – not because he craved power but to uplift the welfare of the 'workers and peasants' and that U Nu's proposals amounted to 'turning back the wheel'. (The full translation of Ne Win's speech to the BSPP seminar can be read in 7 and 8 November 1969 issues of the Rangoon Guardian and the Working People's Daily. U Nu had by now already declared in London that he was still 'the legal Prime Minister').

In a press conference held in London on 27 August 1969, U Nu announced that he was the 'legal Prime Minister' and 'pledged to the people of Burma' that he would not give up his struggle for democracy in Burma and that Burma was under the 'same kind of fascism' which (Burma's independence hero) 'General Aung San had fought' (during the freedom struggle and the resistance against the Japanese occupation of Burma during the Second World War, including both U Nu and Ne Win as his companions). The full text of U Nu's press conference in London can be read in the 1 September 1969 issues of the Rangoon Guardian and the Working People's Daily. The text of U Nu's press conference announcement, made in English, in London, was also translated into Burmese in full and was published in all the State-controlled Burmese language newspapers of 1 September 1969.

U Nu then used former Central Intelligence Agency (CIA) official Bill Young to help him raise international funding for founding the United National Liberation Front (UNLF). By the end of 1970, they had garnered more than $2 million.

U Nu later formed the Parliamentary Democracy Party (PDP) and led an armed resistance group. U Nu's 'resistance group' consisted of no more than several hundred or at most a few thousand at its peak and his avowal to fight and overthrow Ne Win from the Thai border met with abject failure. He subsequently accepted an offer of amnesty granted by Ne Win and returned to Burma on 29 July 1980. (The news item that "former Prime Minister U Nu and wife Mya Yi arrving [sic?] back at Rangoon airport at 3:30 pm in the afternoon of 29 July 1980" can be read in the 30 July 1980 issues of the Rangoon Guardian and the Working People's Daily).

8888 Uprising

After keeping a low profile, teaching Buddhism in Burma and the United States – U Nu visited Northern Illinois University in the US to lecture on Buddhism in 1987 – U Nu became once again politically active during the 8888 Uprising forming the first new political party, the League for Democracy and Peace (LDP). Echoing his assertion that he was the 'legal Prime Minister' of August 1969 in London, U Nu reiterated on 9 September 1988 in Rangoon that he was still the 'legal Prime Minister'.

U Nu initiated to form an interim government and invited opposition leaders to join him. Indian Prime minister Rajiv Gandhi had already signaled his readiness to recognize the interim government and Burmese troops started to change sides with Burmese Navy almost totally siding with the opposition. However, Aung San Suu Kyi categorically rejected U Nu's plan by saying "the future of the opposition would be decided by masses of the people". Ex-Brigadier Aung Gyi, another opposition politician at the time of the 8888 crisis, followed and rejected the plan after Suu Kyi's refusal. Crucial months were passed on the street and the interim government was not internationally recognized due to lack of support from opposition. Political analyst Susanne Prager-Nyein described Aung San Suu Kyi's refusal as "a major strategic mistake".

Nonetheless U Nu formed his own 'government' reappointing Mahn Win Maung who was overthrown in the 1962 coup as 'President'. After the State Law and Order Restoration Council (SLORC) took over power on 18 September 1988, the SLORC repeatedly asked U Nu to formally 'abolish' his 'interim government', but U Nu refused to do so. As a result, Nu was put under house arrest on 29 December 1989. SLORC spokesmen at that time stated that although U Nu could have been tried for 'treason', due to his advanced age and his contribution to the freedom struggle, he was not charged with that offence. He was released on 23 April 1992 the same day the SLORC Chairman Senior General Saw Maung was forced to relinquish power and replaced by military junta (officially named the State Peace and Development Council) chief Senior General Than Shwe.

Religious works

A devout Theravada Buddhist, U Nu had long been the popular spiritual leader of his country. In 1950, with the Karen Uprising, the Anti-Fascist People's Freedom League controlled Parliament launched a Peace Within One Year campaign, involving various military actions and governmental reforms. Amongst this backdrop, U Nu combined orders for military equipment from India with a request to receive Buddhist relics on loan. U Nu toured the relics around the country, reaching into the stable parts of the countryside were ethnic unrest was still present, hoping to inspire peace through the power of the Buddha.

He had the Kaba Aye Pagoda and the Maha Pasana Guha (Great Cave) built in 1952 in preparation for the Sixth Buddhist Synod that he convened and hosted in 1954–1956 as prime minister. In a 1957 interview with American news broadcast See It Now, he stated that:

He also stated that although he was born Buddhist, he was particularly attracted by the Kalama Sutta, a Buddhist doctrine that challenges believers to actively question their beliefs and views instead of passively accepting them:

On 29 August 1961, Parliament passed the State Religion Promotion Act of 1961, initiated by U Nu himself. This act made Buddhism the official state religion of the country, one of his election campaign promises as well as instated the Buddhist lunar calendar by official observance of the so-called Buddhist sabbath days, or Uposatha, in lieu of the Christian Sabbath day, Sunday. On Uposatha days, state broadcasting radio was required to dedicate its airtime to religious programs, while state schools and government offices were closed, and liquor was not allowed to be served in public spaces. The act also required government schools to teach Buddhist students the Buddhist scriptures, banned the slaughtering of cattle (beef became known as todo tha; lit. hush hush meat), and commuted death sentences for parolees.

Beyond stately actions, U Nu also took to fulfil the Buddhist ideal of the Chakravartin by engaging in personal merit-making and increasingly strong vows of celibacy to atone for the sins of the nation and to bring stability to his rule through religious devotion.

When General Ne Win took over in 1962, one of his first acts was to repeal the Buddhist acts that had passed under U Nu's administration, including the ban on cow slaughtering and declaration of Buddhism as the state religion, as they had alienated largely Christian ethnic minorities such as the Kachins and the Karens, and perhaps was symbolic of a personality clash between Nu and Ne Win.

Literary works
U Nu authored several books some of which have been translated into English. Among his works are The People Win Through (1951), Burma under the Japanese (1954), An Asian Speaks (1955), and Burma Looks Ahead (1951). His autobiography (1907–1962) Ta-Tei Sanei Tha (Naughty Saturday-born) was published in India by Irrawaddy Publishing (U Maw Thiri) in 1975. An earlier version had been published in 1974; it was translated into English by U Law Yone, Editor of the (Rangoon) Nation till 1963 and who, like U Nu, was jailed by the Revolutionary Council in the 1960s. Before U Nu became Prime Minister, he had translated, in the late 1930s, Dale Carnegie's book, How to Win Friends and Influence People (Lupaw Luzaw Louknee in Burmese – in retranslation, it roughly meant 'How to Take Advantage of Man by Man'); later the translated name was changed to the more palatable 'Meikta Bala Htika' which can be retranslated as A Treatise on Friendly Social Contract. The translated work under the second title became a prescribed text in schools in the 1950s as was U Nu's original work in Burmese, The People Win Through or The Sound of the People Victorious (Ludu Aungthan).
He organized a Burma Translation Society and first volume of Burmese Encyclopedia published in 1954. The Sarpay Beikhman continued those works.

Novelist and playwright
Besides serving as Prime Minister, U Nu was also an accomplished novelist and playwright. In a work from the colonial period titled Yesset pabeikwe or It's So Cruel (Man, the Wolf of Man) U Nu describes how during the colonial period rich landlords were able to get away with just about any crime they wished to perpetrate.

The play The Sound of the People Victorious (Ludu Aungthan) that U Nu wrote while he was Prime Minister is about the havoc that Communist ideologies can wreak in a family. Strangely enough the first production of the play seems to have been in Pasadena, California. It later became a popular comic book in Burma, was translated into English, and made into a feature film at the height of the Cold War in the 1950s. The older generation in Burma can still remember having studied the play in their schooldays.

In the play Thaka Ala, published just before the 1962 coup, U Nu paints an extremely ugly picture of corruption both amongst the high-ranking politicians in power at the time as well as among the communist leaders who were gaining ascendancy. This is a play in the vernacular, a genre that hardly exists in Burmese literature. A translation into English was published in instalments in the Guardian newspaper. The play was critical of the current state of politics in Burma at the time (around 1960) and in this critical stance it resembles Thein Pe Myint's The Modern Monk (Tet Hpongyi in Burmese). Like The Modern Monk, it deals with scandalous sexual liaisons not much in keeping with traditional modes of Burmese behaviour.One of the greatest female writers of the Post-colonial period is Journalgyaw Ma Ma Lay. Khin Myo Chit was another important writer, who wrote, among her works, The 13-Carat Diamond (1955), which was translated into many languages. The journalist Ludu U Hla was the author of numerous volumes of ethnic minority folklore, novels about inmates in U Nu-era jails, and biographies of people working in different occupations. The Prime Minister U Nu himself wrote several politically oriented plays and novels.

Death

Nu died of natural causes on 14 February 1995 at his home in Yangon's Bahan Township at the age of 87, after his wife Mya Yi (1910–1993) died. They had five children, San San (daughter), Thaung Htaik (son), Maung Aung (son), Than Than (daughter) and Cho Cho (daughter).

See also
History of Burma

References

Further reading

.
Hunter, Edward (1957) The People Win Through: a play by U Nu (New York: Taplinger Publishing Co).

External links

Time Magazine cover
The House on Stilts Time magazine cover story, August 30, 1954
U Nu's speech on Burmese independence, January 4, 1948
U Nu – Centennial Birthday May 25, 2007
The Columbia Encyclopedia
Encyclopædia Britannica article
Burma Looks Ahead
Thaka-Ala, a political satire by U Nu
BookRags – U Nu
U Nu's hundred of photo gallery at www.pbase.com

|-

|-

Anti-Fascist People's Freedom League politicians
Burma Socialist Party politicians
Burmese literature
Burmese Theravada Buddhists
People from Ayeyarwady Region
State of Burma
University of Yangon alumni
Burmese writers
Burmese collaborators with Imperial Japan
1907 births
1995 deaths
Theravada Buddhism writers
Buddhist spiritual teachers